is a Japanese retired high jumper. His personal best jump is 2.32 metres, achieved in September 1993 in Fukuoka. This is the former Japanese record and current Japanese university record. He competed at the 1999 World Championships without reaching the final.

Personal best

International competition

National title
Japanese Championships
High jump: 2001

References

External links

1973 births
Living people
Athletes from Tokyo
Japanese male high jumpers
World Athletics Championships athletes for Japan
Japan Championships in Athletics winners